John Gerald Christopher Ryan (4 March 1921 – 22 July 2009) was a British animator and cartoonist. He was best known for his character Captain Pugwash.

Biography
Ryan was born in Edinburgh, the son of diplomat Sir Andrew Ryan. He expressed his love of writing and drawing early in life, creating his first book, Adventures of Tommy Brown, at the age of 7. Ryan attended Ampleforth College, a Catholic boarding school. After serving as an officer with the Lincolnshire Regiment in Burma during the Second World War, Ryan studied at the Regent Street Polytechnic.

Whilst teaching art at Harrow, Ryan first created Captain Pugwash as a comic strip for The Eagle in 1950, although the strip was dropped after three months as it was felt to be aimed at younger readers than the target audience. Unperturbed, Ryan created Harris Tweed, Special Agent. However, when The Radio Times commissioned him to provide a strip he resurrected the Captain Pugwash strip, and in 1957 he was commissioned by the BBC to produce a series of animation shorts featuring the character, originally running from 1957 to 1958.  The animation of these films was done in real time (rather than by the stop-frame animation method) using an ingenious system of cut-out characters and boats, moved by hidden cardboard levers.  Further episodes were commissioned almost twenty years later in 1974, and in all 126 episodes were made with the last airing in 1975. Ryan also wrote and illustrated a number of children's books featuring the character; in the 1980s three new comic albums appeared.

Through his animation studio, John Ryan Studios, he also created The Adventures of Sir Prancelot (1971–1972) and Mary Mungo & Midge (1969) for the BBC, the latter for the Watch With Mother slot.

In 1981, Ryan presented The Ark Stories for Yorkshire Television, the series being produced by Anne Wood. Each episode saw Ryan present and illustrate a story about Noah's Ark, either prior to or during the Great Flood.

He also created Lettice Leefe, the Greenest Girl in School, a comic strip for Girl magazine.

Ryan, a Catholic (his brother was the theologican Columba Ryan), provided illustrations and cartoons for Catholic newspapers, including the Catholic Herald, and several collections of these cartoons were published as books.

Towards the end of his life, he was resident in Rye.

There are a number of Ryan's original book illustrations on permanent loan at the Centre for the Study of Cartoons, University of Kent.

In addition to the 24 books in the Captain Pugwash series and the 11 in his Noah's Ark series, he produced a further 24 books.

Ryan died in hospital in Rye, East Sussex. He is survived by his wife Priscilla and his three children. His daughter Isabel Ryan provided Mary's voice in Mary, Mungo and Midge.

Family
His brother was Roman Catholic theologian and philosopher Columba Ryan. His father was diplomat Andrew Ryan.

References

External links
 Jedis Children's TV Captain Pugwash page, contains a 1974 interview with Ryan on the animation of Captain Pugwash

1921 births
2009 deaths
20th-century British artists
20th-century British male writers
20th-century British writers
Alumni of the University of Westminster
Artists from Edinburgh
British animated film directors
British animators
British Army personnel of World War II
British cartoonists
British children's writers
British comic strip cartoonists
British comics artists
British Roman Catholics
British television directors
People educated at Ampleforth College
Royal Lincolnshire Regiment officers
Writers from Edinburgh
Writers who illustrated their own writing